TTW may stand for:

 Type to winners
 Tennessee–Tombigbee Waterway
 Territorial waters
 Thai Tap Water Supply, tap water producer and distributor in Thailand
 Tilting three-wheeler
 The Time Traveler's Wife
 Transition to war
 The Third Wheel, third episode in the third season of the television series How I Met Your Mother 
 Tigerair Taiwan, ICAO code for a low-cost carrier based in Taiwan formed as a joint venture between China Airlines Group and Tiger Airways Holdings
 A Tale of Two Wastelands, a modification for the game Fallout: New Vegas that megres the entirety of Fallout 3 allowing both to be played as a single game